Muhammad bin Jamil Zeno (1925 – Oct 2010) was an Islamic scholar and author.

His name has also been transliterated differently in the English speaking world. Whilst his publishers Dar-Us-Salam in Riyadh translate it as 'Muhammad bin Jamil Zeno', it is also rendered as Muhammad Bin/Ibn Jamal/Jamaal/Jameel Zeeno/Zaino/Zayno/Zaynoo/Zeenoo/Zino/Zainu.

Controversy
Zeno (as Zainu) features heavily in the 2005 report 'Saudi Publications On Hate Ideology Invade American Mosques', by Freedom House, the New York-based human rights organization.

Zeno's book, ‘Islamic Guidelines for Individual and Social Reform’, featured in the 2007 PBS Frontline documentary Homegrown: Islam In Prison, which was part of the America at a Crossroads television series. The documentary states that his books were distributed to prisons by the controversial Al-Haramain Islamic Foundation.

Zeno featured heavily a study by the neoconservative Centre for Social Cohesion, 'Hate on the State: How British libraries encourage Islamic extremism' by James Brandon and Douglas Murray, in which he has been described as "One of the most virulent Wahhabi clerics whose books are stocked in the Tower Hamlets libraries." which BBC News also reported on.

Zeno was also criticised for writing that "Singing is a prelude to adultery…handclapping and whistling are abominable acts which one should abandon" and "Dolls made in foreign countries should not be bought and given to children. Why should we support the finance of…Jewish exporters?"

See also
Abd Al-Aziz Fawzan Al-Fawzan
Muhammad Taqi-ud-Din al-Hilali
Muhammad Muhsin Khan
Saleh Al-Fawzan
List of Muslim educational institutions

External links
 "Questions & Answers on `Aqeedah" (Shaik Muhammad bin Jamil Zeeno)

References

1925 births
2010 deaths
Syrian Muslim scholars of Islam
Syrian Salafis
University of Aleppo alumni
People from Aleppo